Harvie Dwight Pocza (born September 22, 1959) is a Canadian former professional ice hockey player who briefly played in the National Hockey League with the Washington Capitals.  Pocza was drafted 67th overall by the Capitals in the 1979 NHL Entry Draft.

Career statistics

External links

Profile at hockeydraftcentral.com

1959 births
Living people
Billings Bighorns players
Calgary Centennials players
Canadian ice hockey left wingers
Hershey Bears players
Port Huron Flags players
Sportspeople from Lethbridge
Washington Capitals draft picks
Washington Capitals players
Ice hockey people from Alberta
Merritt Centennials players